Hernán Alzamora (12 April 1927 – 19 February 2018) was a Peruvian hurdler. He competed in the men's 110 metres hurdles at the 1948 Summer Olympics.

References

1927 births
2018 deaths
Athletes (track and field) at the 1948 Summer Olympics
Peruvian male hurdlers
Olympic athletes of Peru
Place of birth missing
Pan American Games medalists in athletics (track and field)
Pan American Games silver medalists for Peru
Athletes (track and field) at the 1951 Pan American Games
Medalists at the 1951 Pan American Games
20th-century Peruvian people